Standing Ovation: The Greatest Songs from the Stage is the fourth studio album by Scottish singer Susan Boyle. It was released on 13 November 2012. The album features renditions of songs from prominent musical theatre shows and films. It also includes duets with American singer Donny Osmond and The Phantom of the Opera star Michael Crawford.

Examples of the musical works involved include Jekyll & Hyde and Fame. The album experienced commercial success in both the United Kingdom and the United States, hitting the #12 slot in the Billboard 200 chart.

Track listing

Charts

Weekly charts

Year-end charts

Certifications

Release history

References

Susan Boyle albums
2012 albums
Syco Music albums
Columbia Records albums